Japanese football in 1923.

Emperor's Cup

National team

Results

Players statistics

Births
January 15 - Koji Miyata
March 2 - Masao Ono

External links

 
Seasons in Japanese football